Karim Ali Hadji (born May 14, 1981 in Chlef) is an Algerian footballer. He currently plays as an attacking midfielder for ASO Chlef in the Algerian Ligue Professionnelle 1.

Honours
 Won the Algerian Ligue Professionnelle 1 twice:
 Once with USM Alger in 2004–05
 Once with ASO Chlef in 2010–11

References

1981 births
Living people
People from Chlef
Algerian footballers
Algerian Ligue Professionnelle 1 players
ASO Chlef players
USM Alger players
Algeria under-23 international footballers
MO Béjaïa players
Association football forwards
21st-century Algerian people